The 1995–96 DFB-Pokal was the 53rd season of the annual German football cup competition. 64 teams competed in the tournament of six rounds which began on 15 August 1995 and ended on 24 May 1996. In the final, 1. FC Kaiserslautern defeated Karlsruher SC 1–0 thereby claiming their second title. In the first round, SV 1916 Sandhausen defeated VfB Stuttgart 13–12 on penalties, marking the game with the most goals in German professional football ever.

Matches

First round

Second round

Round of 16

Quarter-finals

Semi-finals

Final

References

External links
 Official site of the DFB 
 Kicker.de 

1995-96
1995–96 in German football cups